Monopeltis zambezensis is a species of amphisbaenian in the family Amphisbaenidae. The species is indigenous to southern Africa.

Geographic range
M. zambezensis is found in Zambia, Zimbabwe, and presumably western Mozambique.

Habitat
The preferred natural habitat of M. zambezensis is red soil in Mopane woodlands.

Description
M. zambezensis is very small and slender for its genus. Adults usually have a snout-to-vent length (SVL) of only .

Reproduction
The mode of reproduction of M. zambezensis is unknown.

References

Further reading
Broadley DG (1997). "A review of the Monopeltis capensis complex in southern Africa (Reptilia: Amphisbaenidae)". African Journal of Herpetology 46 (1): 1–12.
Broadley DG, Gans C, Visser J (1976). "Studies on Amphisbaenians (Amphisbaenia, Reptilia). 6. The Genera Monopeltis and Dalophia in Southern Africa". Bulletin of the American Museum of Natural History 157: 311–486. (Monopeltis zambezensis, pp. 398–401, Figures 60–64).
Gans C, Broadley DG (1974). "a new dwarfed species of Monopeltis from the middle Zambezi Valley (Reptilia: Amphisbaenia)". Arnoldia, Rhodesia 6 (35): 1–5. (Monopeltis zambezensis, new species).
Gans C (2005). "Checklist and Bibliography of the Amphisbaenia of the World". Bull. American Mus. Nat. Hist. (289): 1–130. (Monopeltis zambezensis, p. 38).

Monopeltis
Reptiles of Zimbabwe
Reptiles of Zambia
Reptiles of Mozambique
Reptiles described in 1974
Taxa named by Carl Gans
Taxa named by Donald George Broadley